The British Academy Video Games Award for Audio Achievement is an award presented annually by the British Academy of Film and Television Arts (BAFTA). It is given in honor to "excellence in the design and application of sound, dialogue and music to create an exceptional audio experience". 

The award was first presented at the 1st British Academy Games Awards in 2004 to Grand Theft Auto: Vice City under the name Sound. Since then, it has gone through several name changes, going by Audio Achievement at the 2nd British Academy Games Awards, Audio at the 3rd British Academy Games Awards and Use of Audio from the 3rd to the 7th British Academy Games Awards. The category returned to Audio Achievement at the 8th British Academy Games Awards and has been handed out under that name ever since.

As developers, EA DICE hold the record for most nominations in this category, with seven, and are tied with Santa Monica Studio for most wins, each with two. Infinity Ward and Sledgehammer are the developers with the most nominations without a win, with four. Sony Interactive Entertainment is the publisher with the most nominations, with twenty seven and have a leading eight wins in the category. Xbox Game Studios have the most nominations without a win, with six.

The current holder of the award is Returnal by Housemarque and Sony, which won at the 18th British Academy Games Awards in 2022.

Winners and nominees
In the following table, the years are listed as per BAFTA convention, and generally correspond to the year of game release in the United Kingdom.

 Note: The games that don't have recipients on the table had Development Team credited on the awards page.

Multiple nominations and wins

Developers

Publishers

References

External links
Official website

Audio Achievement